Jordan Christopher (October 23, 1940 – January 21, 1996) was an American actor and singer. He was the lead singer of The Wild Ones, who recorded the original version of the rock classic "Wild Thing" after Christopher had left the band.

Early life
Born in Youngstown, Ohio, to Macedonian immigrants Eli and Dorothy Zankoff, he moved at an early age to Akron, where his father ran a downtown bar.

Music and marriage
Christopher became interested in singing with the rise of rock & roll, spending much of his time at the music clubs in Akron's black neighborhoods. He formed a doo-wop group called the Fascinations, who released unsuccessful singles on several small labels in the early 1960s.

Christopher's break came when he joined The Wild Ones, the house band at New York's Peppermint Lounge, as singer and guitarist. After a residency at the Peppermint Lounge of eight months, The Wild Ones were hired to play at Arthur, the Manhattan discothèque operated by Sybil Williams, then recently divorced from Richard Burton. Within a month of meeting, Christopher and Williamseleven years his seniorbegan dating and married in 1966. They had a daughter named Amy, and he had a daughter named Jodi from a previous marriage.

Thanks to the publicity Williams received as the ex-wife of Richard Burton, there was great interest in Arthur, and The Wild Ones were able to secure a recording contract with United Artists Records, releasing an album, The Arthur Sound. However, Christopher left the band shortly after its release to develop an acting career. Producer Gerry Granahan later commissioned Brill Building songwriter Chip Taylor to write a song specifically for the band. "Wild Thing"sung by the band's new lead vocalist, Chuck Alden, not Christopherwas the result.

Acting
Christopher acted in several films including The Fat Spy (1966), Return of the Seven (1966), The Tree (1969), Pigeons (1971), Star 80 (1983), Brainstorm (1983) and That's Life! (1986). However his most celebrated role was as a dissolute rock star in the cult film Angel, Angel, Down We Go (1969), in which he played the male lead opposite Jennifer Jones. He also appeared on Broadway in Sleuth.

Later life
Christopher continued to act intermittently, and he worked behind the scenes with his wife in her operation of the New Theatre on 54th Street in New York City and Bay Street Theater in Sag Harbor, New York .

Christopher died of a heart attack on January 21, 1996, at the age of 55.

Filmography

References

Local history: Fascinating life for Buchtel alum -- Ohio.com

The Making Of… The Troggs’ ‘Wild Thing’ -- Uncut

External links
 

1940 births
1996 deaths
American male film actors
20th-century American male actors
Male actors from Youngstown, Ohio
Male actors from Akron, Ohio
Singers from Ohio
20th-century American singers
20th-century American male singers